The Chile men's national field hockey team represents Chile in men's international field hockey competitions and is controlled by the Federación Chilena de Hockey Sobre Césped. It is affiliated with the International Hockey Federation and the Pan American Hockey Federation.

Hockey arrived in Chile in the mid-20th century. Chile has never qualified for the Hockey World Cup until 2021, but it has had success at the youth level, as in Versailles 1979. In the Pan American Games, Chile has been present in all years except the year 1967, obtaining a 3rd-place finish in 1983, 2007, 2011 and 2015. By reaching the final of the 2022 Men's Pan American Cup, they qualified for the 2023 World Cup where they will be making their World Cup debut.

Tournament history

World Cup

Pan American Games

Pan American Cup

South American Games

South American Championship

Defunct competitions

Hockey World League

Champions Challenge II

*Draws include matches decided on a penalty shoot-out.

Team

Current squad
The squad for the 2023 Men's FIH Hockey World Cup.

Head coach: Jorge Dabanch

Recent call–ups
The following players have also represented Chile in the last 12 months.

See also
Chile women's national field hockey team

References

External links

FIH profile

Field hockey
Americas men's national field hockey teams
National team
Men's sport in Chile